The 2006–07 Michigan State Spartans men's ice hockey season was the 66th season of play for the program and 26th in the CCHA. They represented Michigan State University in the 2006–07 NCAA Division I men's ice hockey season. They were coached by Rick Comley, in his 5th season and played their home games at Munn Ice Arena. The team won the 2007 NCAA Division I men's ice hockey tournament, the 3rd title in program history.

Season

Regular season
Entering the season, Michigan State was ranked in the top 5, coming off of their best postseason performance in years. While the team had lost several players to graduation, they received great contributions from a cadre of sophomore players. While the line formed by Justin Abdelkader, Tim Crowder and Tim Kennedy proved to be a potent combination, it was in goal where Bryan Lerg proved to be just as, if not more, integral to the fortunes of the Spartans.

MSU had a mediocre start to the season, sometimes living up to their ranking an other times not. Much of this was a result of Lerg's inconsistent play, however, with only freshman Bobby Jarosz as a backup, Rick Comley decided to let his starting goalie play through the struggles. By Thanksgiving, MSU had a decent record and had performed well against other ranked teams. The College Hockey Showcase put the Spartans on the road against two strong WCHA clubs. They lost the first game against #1 Minnesota and then fell in the second game to defending national champion, Wisconsin. Though their ranking wasn't harmed too badly by the sweep, the Spartans were now sitting at .500 and could ill-afford many more like performances if they wanted to keep their NCAA hopes alive.

The team finished out the next few weeks with a winning mark, though hardly looked like world-beaters against a pair of weak conference opponents. After returning from the winter break, however, The Spartans looked like a renewed team. They kicked off the second half of their season by capturing the Great Lakes Invitational, which included downing hated rival Michigan in the championship. After splitting with a top-ranked Miami squad, The Spartans didn't lose for over a month. That stretch of good hockey helped raise the team up to #6 in the polls and put them in a prime position for the tournament. Unfortunately, the team's offense faltered at the end of the regular season and MSU dropped four of their last five games.

Postseason
MSU entered the CCHA tournament ranked #13 and could not afford a poor performance if they intended to be one of the 16 teams in the national tournament. Fortunately, the offense rediscovered their scoring touch and posted a pair of 4–2 wins over Nebraska–Omaha to reach the semifinal. While they lost the next game to Michigan, the sixth meeting of the two on the season, the Spartans retained their #10 ranking and received an at-large bid.

The selection committee gave Michigan State a #3 seed and sent them to Grand Rapids. They took on Boston University in the first game and had one of their best performances on the season, putting up 5 goals against one of the nations' best defensive teams. The second game would be an even bigger test, however, as MSU had to get through the second overall seed, Notre Dame. The Irish had the nation's best defense and had allowed less than 2 goals per game thanks to the NCAA's top goaltender, David Brown. Unsurprisingly, the game was a defensive struggle with both teams waiting for the other to make a mistake. Both squads had several opportunities on the power play but it was Michigan State who took advantage. The Spartans opened the scoring in the second on a goal from Chris Mueller. MSU remained dominant in the second even after taking a pair of minor penalties and limited the Irish to just 3 shots in the frame. Tim Kennedy added a man-advantage marker of his own in the third to give his team a 2-goal edge. Notre Dame fought back and finally beat Lerg with over 5 minutes to play but they could not find the equalizer and Michigan State held on for a narrow victory.

By the time they reached the national semifinal, Michigan State saw a far less daunting task in front of them. All four #1 seeds had already been eliminated. Despite the favorable conditions, MSU got off to a terrible start against Maine by surrendering 3 goals in the first three and a half minutes of the match. Jeff Lerg brushed off the two markers and refused to allow any more to the Black Bears. Over the final 56 minutes of the game, Michigan State outscored Maine 4–0 with goals coming from across their lineup. The victory sent Michigan State to their first title game in 20 years.

When the Spartans opened against Boston College, it appeared like they were going to be run over by the Eagles. BC carried the play throughout the first period, outshooting MSU 13–6, but neither team managed to score. The second saw a reversal with Michigan State doubling up BC in shots, however, Brian Boyle was the only one to find the back of the net. To make matters worse, MSU squandered three successive BC penalties that game them nearly 6 consecutive minutes on the power play. With the team growing increasingly desperate for a goal, Michigan State finally converted on their 5th man-advantage of the game when Kennedy skated in on a partial break-away and fired the puck past Cory Schneider. Both goaltenders played well over the following 10 minutes to keep the score knotted at 1 and the game appeared to be heading for overtime. With about 30 seconds to play, Justin Abdelkader skated in on a 3-on-1 and fired a puck off of the crossbar. Rather then deflect out of play, the puck hit the wall and remained live. Several players fought to get control along the boards and the rubber ended up on the stick of Kennedy behind the net. He wheeled around to avoid a check and then found Abdelkader skating towards the goal mouth. Abdelkader slapped the puck far-side, beating Schneider for his only goal of the tournament. With just 19 seconds left on the clock, BC had little choice but to pull their goalie before the drop of the puck. All that served to do, however, was give Chris Mueller an empty net to shoot at and make the final score 3–1.

MSU was one of the least likely champions in NCAA history. Illustrating that point is the lack of awards and honors received by the Spartans. Other than Jeff Lerg, who received the Perani Cup, not a single MSU player won an award, was an All-American or was even on an All-Conference player. Additionally, Michigan State had the fewest wins and lowest winning percentage of any champion since Minnesota in 1974.

Departures

Recruiting

Roster
As of October 1, 2006.

Standings

Schedule and results

|-
!colspan=12 style=";" | Exhibition

|-
!colspan=12 style=";" | Regular Season

|-
!colspan=12 ! style=""; | 

|-
!colspan=12 ! style=""; | 

|-
!colspan=12 style=";" | 

|-
!colspan=12 style=";" |

National championship game

(NE2) Boston College vs. (MW3) Michigan State

Scoring statistics

Goaltending statistics

Rankings

Note: USCHO did not release a poll in weeks 24 or 25, USA Today did not release a poll in week 12.

Awards and honors

Players drafted into the NHL

2007 NHL Entry Draft

† incoming freshman

References

External links

Michigan State Spartans men's ice hockey seasons
Michigan State
Michigan State
Michigan State
Michigan State
Michigan State
Michigan State